Baqla Kuh (also Romanized as Bāqlā Kūh, Bāqalā Kūh, and Bāqelā Kūh; also known as Bāqlā Kūb, Bāqelākān-e Bālā, Bāqeleh Khān, Bāqeleh Kūb, Bāqlā Khān, and Bāqlākūb-e ‘Olyā) is a village in Beyranvand-e Jonubi Rural District, Bayravand District, Khorramabad County, Lorestan Province, Iran. At the 2006 census, its population was 201, in 43 families.

References 

Towns and villages in Khorramabad County